Sylvia Skratek (born December 23, 1950) is an American politician who served as a member of the Washington State Senate, representing the 47th district from 1991 to 1995.

References

1950 births
Living people
Democratic Party Washington (state) state senators
Women state legislators in Washington (state)